The following is a list of characters from the light novel series and anime Scrapped Princess, written by Ichiro Sakaki with illustrations by Yukinobu Azumi.

Humans

Pacifica Casull

, also referred to as the Scrapped Princess. According to a prophecy from the Church of Mauser, she is cursed to destroy the world of Providence on her sixteenth birthday. Her parents worried about her power, so she was abandoned by them when she was an infant. She was later adopted and raised by the Casull family. Her adoptive siblings, Shannon and Raquel Casull, act as her bodyguards throughout their adventure. Blonde-haired and blue-eyed, she is a sweet and cheerful girl with a healthy appetite, but she wonders how so much suffering can come from her existence and blames herself for it.

According to the prophecy, on the day of her sixteenth birthday, her power to destroy Providence would have reached its zenith and the spell within her would activate. To prevent this, Pacifica is stabbed and killed by her biological twin brother, Forsyth, the crown prince. After her death, Pacifica meets Celia Mauser. Pacifica is a physical recreation of Celia. Celia is a seer who was a vital component in the fight against the aliens during the Genesis Wars. 5000 years ago, as humans were losing the war with the aliens and were going to be sealed, Browning and the other remaining humans came up with a plan to break free of the sealed world by specifically calculating and scattering DNA to prepare the Providence Breaker – who would be able to resist the mind control of the Peacemakers and destroy the very foundations of the system sealing in the humans to free mankind. This Providence Breaker is revealed to be Pacifica.

Despite dying before the power could reach its peak, Pacifica was strong enough so that the destruction of Providence was still possible. After learning why Providence was created, Celia gives Pacifica the choice to determine humanity's future. Even though Pacifica is sympathetic to having a protected, ideal world to live in, she chooses instead to let humans make their own choices, and as a result of this decision, Celia disappears and Providence is destroyed, freeing mankind once and for all. After everything is over and done with and the world is finally safe, Pacifica's life is restored and she returns to her family farm with Shannon, Raquel, and Zefiris.

Pacifica has two notable love interests in the story, including Fulle and Leopold.

Shannon Casull

 is the son of Yuhma and Carol Casull, Raquel's younger brother and Pacifica's older foster brother. Shannon is a skilled swordsman who has sworn to defend Pacifica's life no matter what, but he is reserved and calm despite the many difficulties in the Casull siblings' lives. He is a very protective person. Although Pacifica is on his top priority list, he also looks out for Raquel, Winia Chester, the little girl Cin (Cz's compressed form) and eventually Zefiris. He is a practical man and can cook, clean and shop for groceries, but, when provoked, Shannon loses control of himself not listening to anyone. In episode 6 of the anime, Shannon becomes a temporary Dragon Knight ("D-Knight") and is capable of using the power of a Dragoon named Zefiris to fight the Peacemakers. At one point, Shannon loses his trust in Zefiris. During this time, whenever he merges with the Dragoon, it becomes nearly impossible for him defeat the Peacemakers. Later in the series, he gives Zefiris his trust and fully merges with her. The two fight alongside the Gigas (or Gigantes) against the two remaining Peacemakers. He looks almost exactly like Zefiris's old master, Lord Beckham Mauser, due to the genetic engineering used to create him, Pacifica and Raquel, as explained by Zefiris. In the end, Shannon manages to unlock the full power of the D-Knight and helps to retrieve Pacifica after her death, bringing her back to Earth. He later returns to his family farm with Pacifica, Raquel and Zefiris.

Raquel Casull
 is the oldest of the Casull children, Shannon's sister and Pacifica's foster sister. She is a powerful magic-user and able to cast spells faster than many others. She has assumed a motherly role in the family and is always kind and calm. Like Shannon, she has a striking resemblance to Celia and Beckenham Mauser's sister due to the genetic engineering used in their birth. It is however noted that she is often left the odd one out because of Shannon and Pacifica's close relationship. She does not seem to mind, but she is considerably less close to either of her siblings as they are to each other. Her concern for Pacifica is clear in some episodes; for example, when they went to the cave of bugs to look plants for Pacifica's antidote, she says that she does not mind the danger because her sister's life is in danger. Raquel often encourages Shannon's close relationship with Pacifica by sending her brother out to look for and comfort Pacifica. She is the type to comfort Pacifica by doing something, rather than speaking it. Despite her kind, calm and goofy nature, she will not hesitate to strike down anyone in her way of protecting Pacifica or Shannon. Raquel's normal kindness often serves as a cover for a more aggressive and tactical mind that asserts itself whenever Pacifica or Shannon are in danger. Raquel prepared her father, Yuhma, for death and lit the pyre. Toward the end of the series, Raquel starts to become doubtful while separated from Pacifica and Shannon. When she does find Pacifica (with amnesia), she admits that she does not know what to do, still not knowing where her brother is. Her most vulnerable state is during the last episode, as she holds the stabbed Pacifica in her arms. She later returns to her family farm with Pacifica, Shannon and Zefiris.

Christopher Armalite

Raised as a soldier by the military of the Kingdom of Leinwan,  is the leader of the elite army unit Obstinate Arrow. He is an expert fighter and wields a large battle axe that can be folded and concealed. He is the honorable antagonist of the series, but also a developing hero. Ordered to eliminate the Scrapped Princess, he kidnaps Winia Chester to lay a trap for Pacifica's guardians. Shannon beats him in a duel in Glass Canyon and asks him to stay away in exchange for sparing his life. Before Obstinate Arrow can leave the city of Taurus, however, they learn that a Peacemaker (Galil) has come to deal with the Scrapped Princess and the whole city is at risk. The soldiers briefly ally themselves with the Casulls to fend off the Peacemaker's onslaught. To gain access to the castle's resources, Christopher is officially adopted by Obstinate Arrow's superior, Baroness Bairach, becoming Christopher Bairach. He befriends the crown prince, Forsyth, and researches Grendel's prophecies to understand the Scrapped Princess's true destiny. After the Baroness is dismissed from commanding Obstinate Arrow, the team serves under the Major. Christopher arrests Pacifica then, but later helps her escape. Having "betrayed" the King, he joins the Casulls. When Zefiris asks him why he defends Pacifica, even though he does not carry the guardian gene, he simply answers that it is because he chooses to. After Providence is 'destroyed' and mankind is freed, he marries Winia and becomes good friends with the Casulls, while maintaining his friendship with Prince Forsyth.

Winia Chester
 is an introverted and lonesome inn-maid, taken in and raised by her uncle out of pity after her parents died. She spends time with and becomes friends with Pacifica, and it is one of the few times she has smiled and laughed since her parents were killed. When Christopher kidnaps her and takes her to the Glass Canyon, Pacifica's identity as the Scrapped Princess is revealed to her. Although initially confused and unable to accept the fact that her new friend is "the poison that will destroy the world", Winia eventually comes around, and continues to have a close friendship with Pacifica. In the Glass Canyon, she discovers that her kidnapper, Christopher, is also an orphan. After the brief kidnapping episode, she develops a deep attraction to Christopher. After Providence is 'destroyed' and mankind is freed, she is seen with Christopher, knitting some pink clothes in a carriage. Winia also ends up being good friends with the Casulls.

Leopold Scorpus
, also known as Leo, is a clumsy but well-meaning traveling lordling who wishes to become a noble knight. He joins the Casull siblings after discovering them being "harassed" by a group of bandits. Utterly charmed by Pacifica, he vows to protect her and one day marry her. As the first son of Duke Scorpus and heir to his father's territory, he begins as an idealistic youth seeking to join the order of Amber Knights. After meeting the retired legendary knight Doyle Barrett, he begins to question the meaning of justice and chivalry, setting his quest to knighthood in second priority until he can finally discover for himself what chivalry truly is. He constantly carries a stuffed dragon costume with him, a gift from the baker he worked for in the city of Taurus. The headband he wears was a bandage that Pacifica made for him when he hurt himself trying to keep up with their wagon. Leopold talks often with Winia over their mutual friend Pacifica. After mankind is freed, he continues to follow after Pacifica and proposes to her. After an exaggerated pause, she responds by slapping him saying she has better things to do, but is seen blushing as she turns away.

Doyle Barrett
A doctor in a secluded forest area,  used to be the head of the Amber Knights. He defied orders to throw the newborn princess down a cliff and kill her, as he began to doubt the true meaning of justice and chivalry that would have him kill an innocent child. When he found out that Pacifica was that same baby, he made an atonement by helping Raquel to save her life.

Kidaf Gillot the Silencer
 is a bard who tries his luck as a bounty hunter using his ability to command a group of poisonous BUGs with his instrument. His original intention was to use his BUGs to poison and kill Pacifica, but Raquel subdued him in order to collect the antidote from his cave. In awe of Raquel's devotion, Kidaf stopped going after the Scrapped Princess' bounty, and even agreed to help Pacifica find her siblings by sending his bugs to search for them. Much later in the series, he helped Pacifica (then known as Pamela) to get a job in a theater as one of the costumed players. He also helps Leopold and Winia get jobs there – Leo as another player and Winia as the snacks-sales lady. Eventually, when Pacifica gets found out, Kidaf advises her group on escaping the city, and stays behind to inform Raquel about what is going on.  Later still, he helps to resist the Peacemakers.

Prince Forsyth/Forsis
 is the Crown Prince and biological twin brother of Pacifica. Unlike his father, the King, he has his people's welfare as top priority, and despises all unnecessary bloodshed meted to take out the Scrapped Princess. For this reason – the other being his physical resemblance to his mother and Pacifica – he is constantly at conflict with the King. When Baroness Bairach introduces Christopher Armalite to him as her adopted son, the two become close friends. Despite his polite nature and calm appearance, the Prince is highly observant, clever, and quickly figures out that Christopher is more than he appears. Prince Forsyth sees the choices he might have to make between Pacifica, the younger sister he never knew, and his people as a dilemma. This leads him to continually look for information on his sister to try to make an accurate decision. He refuses to allow Christopher to call him by any royal title. The Mauser Cardinal asks Forsyth to be an Envoy of God and think about the greater good of his people. Later, Forsyth arranges a meeting with Pacifica, to finally meet his twin. After a short and awkward conversation he embraces her and apologizes, then draws his sword and stabs her in the back. He then pulls the sword free and drives it into his own chest, to atone for killing his sister by dying with her. He is revived from death when Pacifica 'destroys' Providence. A comment by Christopher at the end of the last episode reveals that Forsyth will soon be crowned the new King.

Bergen
A priest of the Mauser Church known as "The Heretical Procurator". Even though he is a priest of Mauser, he is an easy-going person. He believes that both Mauser and Browning are unnecessary. But he also believes that people need to believe something, otherwise life would be tough. He thinks it is weird to crush something because it is not the thing  you believe in and does not accept Church doings. Later we learn that he is also part of the Guardians like Raquel, Shannon, Leo and Winia. Later in the series he helps Raquel and the others.

Princess Seness Giat
"Beast" Princess of the Giat Empire, she is quite short-tempered, due to her harsh childhood, where people feared her, and she and Pacifica often argued after they met. She is a warrior princess skilled with her sword and magic, and manages to revive the giant floating fortress Skid used 5000 years ago in the Genesis Wars, with the help of the Dragoon, Natalie. Even though Seness is a skilled fighter and magic user, she is still just a little below Shannon's fighting ability and cannot beat him even if she uses her magic and swordsmanship together. This was proven in a fight between her and Shannon. She lasted longer against Shannon than Chris did and that Shannon was one of her few defeats. After the fight, Seness gained some respect for Shannon as a fighter and Raquel as a mage and tactician. Along with two followers, Ruce and Drake, she fights using Gigas, a dragon-like being that is somewhat similar to a Dragoon, but cannot take the form of a person. Another follower, Eirote, seems to be her second in command. She is in charge of most technical work, such as rebuilding the Gigas and maintaining the Skid. Eirote is much kinder and more soft-hearted then Seness and often soothes the Beast Princess's rough temper for others as well as occasionally keeping Seness in line.

Carol Casull
The mother of Shannon and Raquel and adoptive mother of Pacifica – as well as a formidable sorceress. A stately-looking woman with red eyes and silver hair, she was a friend of Pacifica's biological mother, but the relationship seems to have soured. It was she who decided that the infant Pacifica would receive a name that many people would like. Carol plays a greater role in the novel series than in the anime.

Yuhma Casull
The father of Shannon and Raquel and adoptive father of Pacifica. He has tawny skinned and has his biological children's dark hair. He is a jovial man whose composure is difficult to break. Like Carol, Yuhma has a greater role on the novels.

Fulle/Furet
Fulle, eighteen years old, first appears after the spell Ginnungagap creates a destructive tidal wave. Pacifica, who was on a boat, washes up on an island with no memory of who she is. While she is staring at the ocean, Fulle is assessing the damage done to the city. Pacifica follows him home in hopes that she might run into someone who knows who she is. For the next couple of days, Pacifica, now named Pamela by Fulle for the time being, lives with Fulle enjoying what would be an everyday normal life. After some time, both Fulle and Pamela find out that her real name is Pacifica and that she is the Scrapped Princess. Fulle, who used to be in the army, takes it upon himself to protect her and helps her, Winia, and Leo escape the city. Fulle does not survive, as he stays behind to keep the soldiers from getting any closer to her. He is shot with numerous arrows and dies in the streets of the city. It is Shannon who finds his lifeless body. Not knowing who he is, Shannon wonders that "he must have been trying to go somewhere very important", while shutting Fulle's eyes. By the end of the series, Pacifica still carries a small wooden block given to her by Fulle, strapped to her hip, claiming it makes her feel protected.

Dragoons/Dragons
Biological weapons allegedly made by the Dark God and the humans to fight the Peacemakers; actually made to fight aliens, as were the Peacemakers later.  They were created by technology and bound with a master to fight but their program does not naturally allow them to harm humans. They are referred to as Demons by the common people. According to Zefiris, there were originally 200 "production versions" of the Dragoons, but many malfunctioned and could not be used to fight the enemy. Only 26 of the original 200 remained, and those 26 needed to be paired with a human "D-Knight" in order to use their vast power.  Use of much of their power needed to be approved by the human D-Knight. One of the most interesting powers Dragoons possess, along with being able to turn into a full dragon, is their ability to escape into "Phase Space", which appears to be another dimension. From the perspective of the inhabitants of Dustbin, it appears that the Dragoons and Peacemakers just disappear when they transition to Phase Space.

Zefiris (Serial Number 26)
A Dragoon, or powerful spiritual being, who is actually an AI (artificial intelligence) weapon created during the Genesis Wars to battle an alien race that attacked humans 5000 years ago. She was used as a last resort plan to protect the Providence Breaker from the Peacemakers and is the last remaining Dragoon in the world of Providence that is fully functioning. Solemn, calm and quiet, Zefiris first appears as a mysterious character who shows up whenever the Casulls are in trouble and often gives them helpful advice. Zefiris appears to be something like a cosmos guardian (Peacemaker) due to her strange abilities and unfazed demeanour. She takes Shannon as master and merges with him so he can become a D-Knight (D for Dragon or Dragoon) and combat the Peacemakers. Shannon bears a significant resemblance to Becknum Mauser, her old master who died so Zefiris could live. Zefiris places her mission to protect the Providence Breaker above all other things, including the lives of thousands of other humans. Still, she is often in a dilemma about whether to follow the plan that the humans devised 5000 years ago as a last resort to free themselves from the sealed world. Her questioning of the plan contrasts with the views of her counterpart Natalie, who even tries to brainwash Shannon with her powers. In the last episode, Zefiris returns with the Casulls to their family farm to live out her days with her new master.

Natalie (Serial Number 14)
  A fellow Dragoon who knows Zefiris, and took part in the Genesis Wars but, unlike Zefiris, lost most of her powers. To survive, she inhabits an ancient battle-vehicle, the Skid, as part of her body. Due to Natalie's integration with the Skid, she is able to both help or hinder the people on board. In order to continue to survive, Natalie has continued to upgrade her systems, but her abilities are limited and incomplete.  Her personality is also cold and unfeeling, like the Peacemakers. Natalie does not consider herself a Dragoon anymore, even though, technically, she is still a Dragoon. Once, when Zefiris remarked that her methods were too forceful; the Dragoons were in the sealed world of Providence to be the Providence Breaker's Guardians against the Peacemakers, and to help humans. Natalie replied, in a rather unconcerned manner, "I am no longer a Dragoon, but we Dragoons need not go out of our way to help those foolish humans." Hinting that the humans were a class below them (the Peacemakers and the Dragoons). Later in the series, as Natalie is unable to fight as a Dragoon, she helps create Dragoon emulations, the Gigas, who are like the Dragoons and Peacemakers, but do not have independent AIs and seem operated entirely by their human pilots. Natalie no longer considers herself a Dragoon due to the damage she suffered in the Genesis Wars.

Gloria (Serial Number 7)
 Another one of the few Dragoons who barely survived the Genesis Wars, due to the Peacemakers' betrayal. She is barely alive, and is unable to assume her true form of a Dragoon. She first appeared as a giant frog  (using frog DNA to give herself physical form). She chased a terrified Pacifica around the lake until Zefiris dispersed her physical form, revealing a semi-transparent girl that was her humanoid form. After Pacifica followed Zefiris' request to tell Gloria to rest, Gloria thanked her and disappeared for good.

Peacemakers

Cin
A young girl whom Shannon finds outside a town. She claims to have no parents, and said she was waiting for somebody, though she did not know who it was. She follows Shannon home. After a few strange occurrences involving her, Zefiris informs Pacifica that Cin is a Peacemaker in a compressed state (the human girl form) and, on top of that, an artillery type that can cancel out the Dragoons' presence. As if to prove this, as soon as Zefiris says that, Pacifica sees Zefiris disappearing, just as Cin walks into the room. As artillery types were powerful and dangerous, Cz was compressed as Cin to keep them in a more stable condition. Galil, it turns out, was supposed to pick Cz up at the bridge and release her true form, but was eliminated by Zefiris before he could. Steyr went in his place to seek Cin out, finding her with Pacifica and finally "unzipping" her compressed form, causing her to revert to Cz, the Peacemaker. There was, in fact, some foreshadowing about Cz's true identity. In episode 8, when Shannon said that she might be killed if she stayed with them, she replied "I don't die." (which is in fact true as Peacemakers are immortal). Also, she mentioned that she had no parents when Raquel inquired about it, not that they died or she got lost, but that she simply did not have parents. In addition, when Pacifica tried to catch up with her in the woods, Pacifica was nearly out of breath while she was not even panting.

In her human form of Cin, she has difficulty using proper grammar and verb tenses, showing that she is still maturing. As Cz, she is cold and calculating, not caring if she is to die as long as she can take her enemies with her to death. In last episode she manages to say "I'm sorry" using her Cin form voice to Shannon.

Cz
A Peacemaker, or human-shaped weapon programmed to destroy the Scrapped Princess. She wore one of a pair of earring charms which Pacifica gave her when she was Cin, which she continues to wear even after reverting to her Peacemaker form. Later in the show, possibly because of her time as Cin, Cz's mentality is affected and she begins to sympathize with the humans, and later shows some reluctance to go on a mass killing spree. This seems to develop largely from her assignment to follow Shannon (in case he should find Pacifica), as she learns of his motivations and philosophy even while stating she does not care about them. (Note also in episode 18, the two share an umbrella in a scene that mirrors Shannon and Cin's first meeting). Cz is an artillery type cosmos guardian. She appears to look like an attractive woman with long dark hair, but wears an outfit that looks rather different from the humans and is similar to what Steyr wears.  Destroyed in last episode when she purposely drops her defenses taking a shot in the head from D-Knight Shannon.

Steyr

 A fellow Peacemaker like Cz, who comes to retrieve Cin who she claims is Cz in compressed form. She proves this by using her powers to revert Cin into what looks like an adult version of Cin. She does not care how the other Peacemakers feel because their feelings do not really matter. She was in charge of the first attack on the Skid but was injured by Shannon and saved by Cz or else she would have been killed. Of the Peacemakers, Steyr despises humans the most, angered at the 5000 years of "humans killing humans" she has seen. However, she is unaware that the Peacemakers, including her, are Valkyrie Types – an upgraded version of a Dragoon, and that she was created by humans, but got brainwashed into working for the enemy. Steyr's name is also mentioned as Stella. In her normal humanoid form, Steyr looks like a beautiful human woman with long pale blonde hair. Unlike Cz, Steyr is a civilian type cosmos guardian. Almost succeeds in killing Shannon in his full D-Knight form, but is destroyed when she is speared through the head by all three Gigas' light lances.

Galil
Another Peacemaker, and also a civilian type like Steyr. He was killed by Zefiris earlier in the series. Strangely, he does not seem to be very strong, as Zefiris did not have to transform into her true form to destroy him, and she killed him when she was getting decompressed. It may be because Galil was unaware of her ability, and got caught off guard (Zefiris had actually provoked him, which probably led to his blind attack.) Not much is said about his personality, but according to Zefiris he is arrogant and looks down to others people thinking that he is much superior above anyone else. Like all civilian types, he also has blonde hair. He was originally Cz's partner, as the Peacemakers operate in pairs, and was intended to retrieve Cz and decompress her – his death complicates Cz's decompression and forces Steyr to take over.

Socom
An artillery type Peacemaker, like Cz. He appears later in the series. His personality is like Steyr's, but not as sadistic. He is also not as overly determined to get chances to kill people ( In an episode, while waiting for Pacifica to reach Leinwan, Steyr suggested to start killing people, but Socom, coming in the middle of the conversation between Steyr and Cz on who seems more human, said that there was no need to play petty tricks.). Nevertheless, he hates humans, or at least feels no particular desire to protect them. He is Steyr's partner.  Destroyed in the last episode by the three Gigas when they use their light lances to slice him into three sections.

Gods

Celia/Seria Mauser

Celia is actually the Lord Mauser. 5000 years ago, she was a seer in the Genesis Wars, and could read the enemies' movements with great accuracy. With the combined powers of the Peacemakers (also known as the Valkyrie Type) and the Dragoons, humans were a formidable foe. However, in an effort to stop the war and so prevent her brother (a D-knight like Shannon - Zefiris was his Dragoon) and sister from dying Celia betrayed the humans. The effort was in vain though, as both of them died before the war ended. Celia's betrayal led to the brainwashing of the Peacemakers and humanity being sealed in the world called Providence. Celia has maintained her appearance from 5000 years ago in an artificial body. The Peacemakers obey her, and they do not know that she was actually a human woman. It is quite ironic, as the Peacemakers (except for Cz) view humans with contempt as foolish beings who just cause trouble. Celia looks almost exactly like Pacifica, except for having lighter hair and a more matured look. Her siblings also look like Shannon and Raquel (except that Celia is their older sister, instead of younger). This is explained on board the Skiv, when Seness reveals that genetic engineering was used to ensure that the Providence Breaker gene (inherited by Pacifica) and Guardian genes (inherited by Raquel and Shannon, among others) would propagate throughout the captive humans. At the end, when Celia asks Pacifica whether it was right for the humans to be sealed, Pacifica said that people should be set free. Celia then smiles, and before disappearing in the end, says that she is glad that she is finally free to join her dead siblings.

One theory for the notable resemblance between Pacifica and Celia is that Browning had intentionally used Celia's DNA as the DNA for the Providence Breaker, which would explain why the Peacemakers cannot attack her, as Celia and Pacifica are practically the same person.

Lord George Browning
5000 years ago, he led 26 Dragoons, with their D-knights against the alien force – and later the Peacemakers – in an effort to defend humanity. In the 5000 years after the fall and sealing of humanity in Providence, he became a legend; just as Celia/Sillia became Lord Mauser, and the Peacemakers her Apostles, Lord Browning became known as the "Devil", while the faithful Dragoons were referred to as his "Demon servants", despite the fact that he is very much as human as Celia. It was said at first that he tried to wreak havoc on the world, but the Peacemakers and the Lord Mauser apparently defeated him. However, the truth was that the two of them were the most important people who helped defend the human race during the Genesis Wars, until Celia betrayed them and caused the Peacemakers to get brainwashed.  Browning was the one who first proposed giving Celia her power.

Other

Mr. Soopy/Soopy-kun
A dragon mascot used to market bread, buns and cakes by a baker. Originally, Pacifica wears the costume as a part-time advertising job but then gives the job to Leopold. Leopold is allowed to keep the costume as a reward for helping to sell the bread and then often uses the costume as pajamas. At one point, Leopold uses his Mr. Soopy costume to play the part of a dragon, while Pacifica (then known as Pamela) plays the part of the valiant knight and his horse (the design strikingly similar to Leopold and his horse Parabellum). Raquel seems to have an almost obsessive liking for Mr. Soopy, and once conjured up many little Mr. Soopies to help Pacifica prepare dinner.

Dragunov
The one of Casull's two brown horses that receives more limelight, placed on the right when pulling the wagon. While Leopold was making conversation with Pacifica during their first meeting while traveling, Parabellum was staring at Dragunov as they walked, drawing a parallel to their masters. As she pulled the carriage ahead of Parabellum to get away from him, Parabellum continually sped up to match her pace, ending with all three horses running at full speed and Leopold getting a branch to the face. When Shannon left to rescue Winia, he took Dragunov with him. Later, after meeting Cin, the Casulls had no choice but to sell Dragunov and the wagon for money to make ends meet. Later, while fleeing soldiers, Leopold and Fulle picked up Dragunov and Parabellum (coincidentally kept in neighboring stalls) from the stable of "confiscated" horses in the city (we do not know it is Dragunov until Raquel, and then Pacifica, recognizes the horse). In the epilogue, Dragunov goes into labor.

Makarov
One of the Casull's two brown horses, placed on the left when pulling the wagon. After Shannon successfully sold the wagon and Dragunov, Makarov was left to help them carry their supplies. After bumping into Seness and her troops, Makarov was placed in their safekeeping. The horse was eventually reunited with the Casulls after their successful escape from the capital.

Parabellum
Leopold Scorpus' white stallion. While Leopold was taking an interest in Pacifica, Parabellum was taking an interest in Dragunov. However she did not reciprocate and tried to walk ahead of him. However Parabellum kept trying to match her pace and all three horses ending up running at full speed. Later, as Leopold and Winia were helping Fulle to hide Pacifica, Parabellum was confiscated by the Army. Before making their escape, Leopold and Fulle went back into town to pick out two horses to help them get away; Leopold immediately picked out Parabellum by whistling to him. Fulle then took the horse next to Parabellum (Dragunov, coincidentally enough). There is a likely chance that Parabellum sired Dragunov's offspring, seeing that Dragunov goes into labor in the epilogue.

Glossary
Dragoon

Artificial intelligence weapon systems that were originally created to be used as combat weapons against an alien race by then-technologically superior humans. As a last resort, they were programmed to assist and protect the Providence Breaker (Scrapped Princess). Their strength and abilities are roughly equivalent to the Peacemakers but are used to attack the Providence system instead of protecting it. These weapon systems appear to have been around since the Genesis War as they mention they have been hiding from the Peacemakers (sleeping is the term used) for 5,000 years prior to the Providence Breaker's arrival. The Dragoons and the Peacemakers are very alike in personalities, looks and abilities.

5,000 years later, they were said to be the demons of Lord Browning, just like how Celia Mauser became Lord Mauser and the Peacemakers her apostles, when in reality both the Dragoons and Peacemakers are AIs created by the technologically superior humans of 5,000 years ago.

The Dragoons are ageless, and physical environments (in water, a vacuum etc.) do not affect them. They are able to levitate, go into the minds of humans, and teleport. When the Dragoons were first created, over 100 of them caused problems due to improper programming, which led to humans labeling them as troublemakers, and very few people trusted them. The Dragoons are also outwardly cold and unfeeling for humans, as they, like the Peacemakers, also comment on humans as being foolish, greedy creatures (in one episode, Natalie merely said that it could not be helped if 40,000 people were to get killed), only to be used as tools to complete their mission.

The Dragoons, like their Peacemakers counterparts, do not feel many human emotions, such as fear and sadness, or see anything wrong in sacrificing many humans to protect the Providence Breaker. To them, as long as Pacifica manages to reach her 16th birthday, they will do anything at all costs to ensure it, just as the Peacemakers will do anything to stop Pacifica and the Dragoons from breaking the framework of the sealed world of Providence. However, some - like Zefiris - are different. She has more feelings, unlike the other Dragoons, who are cold and emotionless, and is often put into a moral dilemma on the methods, and wonders if they are too cruel and are sacrificing too many humans to achieve the goal of breaking the framework of the world of Providence. The Dragoons also have a true form, like the Peacemakers. In their true forms, the Dragoons turn into a large, powerful dragon.

The Dragoons that have appeared in the series are Zefiris, Gloria and Natalie.

There is a mythological depiction of the Genesis Wars on the wall in the Mauser church, where by which beings holding spears were seen descending from the skies onto what appears to be dragons. It actually depicts the brainwashed Peacemakers and the aliens fighting in the war against Mankind and their Dragoons.

Genesis War

Occurred 5000 years ago where humanity was in a massive war with alien intelligent life-forms. Instead of completely eliminating all of humanity, the aliens contact a human woman who betrays humanity in a desperate attempt to save her loved ones. This betrayal confines humanity to a contained world known as Dust Bin. It is not known whether there are humans that survived the Genesis War outside of the sealed world.

Guardian

Human beings with select genetic traits whereby they are able to draw on greater power to protect the Scrapped Princess, Pacifica (Providence Breaker). Several characters in the series possess this trait, including Shannon, Raquel, Leopold and Winia.

Mauser Faith

The predominant religion of the Scrapped Princess world. Used by Providence to maintain control of humanity as they believe the controlled world's system is the will of God. Lord Mauser (real name Celia Mauser) is in actuality the seer who betrayed humanity during the Genesis Wars and sealed them in this closed world to prevent the extinction of humanity. She did so in a desperate attempt to save her brother and sister but was too late as they both perished. Now, she runs the system and controls the fate of humanity. Celia's body and soul was maintained for 5000 years so she could run the system and give the Grendel Prophecies.

Peacemakers/Cosmos Guardians

A group of beings that have formidable powers and are supposedly the caretakers of the world. To the present humans, they were mainly known as cosmos guardians (or the Gods of the world). However, the Peacemakers are usually cruel, and have no qualms about killing humans. As Shannon said once to Cz: "You look like humans, walk and behave like humans, but you say cruel things which no human beings would ever say". They exist to maintain the Providence System at any cost.

The Peacemakers outward appearance is that of attractive-looking humans, but their personalities are usually sadistic. Their abilities are similar to the Dragoons, and they are ageless. Their predominant role is that of ceasing Pacifica's life, though they are unable to attack her directly, as that would cause Pacifica's latent ability of being able to destroy the Peacemakers to manifest itself. It is also mentioned that humans cannot oppose the wills of the Peacemakers/Cosmos Guardians, and that Pacifica is the only exception, as she is able to go against their wills.

The series also says that the Peacemakers operate in pairs. However, Cz, after experiencing many different events in her human form as a child, begins to sympathize with Pacifica and other humans, and to doubt her role as a cosmos guardian, wondering if what they, as the Peacemakers, are doing is right. Although she threatens to kill thousands of people per day at one point in the series, later on, she is accused/goaded by Steyr, another Peacemaker of having been "softened by the humans". Steyr goes on to taunt Cz by telling her that she "might as well go and live among them". The Peacemakers consist of civilian type and artillery type cosmos guardians, with the artillery types being the stronger of the two in terms of offensive power. Civilian types tend to prefer using manipulation and subterfuge to achieve their aims.

Originally, the Peacemakers, like the Dragoons, were created by humans as combat weapons, but were captured and reprogrammed by the aliens.  The Peacemakers are actually Valkyrie Type: they are basically Dragoons, only they are independent systems—which backfired as that made it possible for the aliens to reprogram them, unlike the Dragoons who needed a D-knight to access such capabilities. However, Zefiris and Natalie are usually able to hold off the Peacemakers' attacks. The Peacemakers' most common attack is their 2nd Class Divine Punishment, where they transform into a larger form. They are however, not allowed to use their strongest attack: 1st Class Divine Punishment Manifestation, within the atmosphere for fear of damaging the controlled world of Providence. However, the Peacemakers do use it in episode 24 when the Dragoons and the Peacemakers are evacuated out of the controlled world into space during the final battle, just before Pacifica turns 16.

The known Peacemakers are Steyr, Shiizu/Cz (both are 'female' Peacemakers), Socom and Galil (Their male counterparts).

Phase Space

Apparently a pocket dimension that Dragoons and Peacemakers can escape to using some type of advanced technology. In episode 12 of the anime, Zefiris and Shannon escape to Phase Space after being overpowered by a powerful Peacemaker (Steyr/Stella). There are also times where the Dragoons and Peacemakers mention that they existed in Phase Space and were contained there.

Providence Breaker

The system that will terminate the controlled world and, in theory, free humanity from their unknowing prison. Also known as the Scrapped Princess. The Providence Breaker is also the only human who can defy the wills of the Cosmos Guardians. She can also destroy the proxies used to attack humans that are created by the Peacemakers.

Providence

The controlled world in which humans live and also the system which maintains it. The series suggests that humans are born with genetic information that allows the Peacemaker system and Providence rules to control them completely, thereby making any attempt to escape it impossible without the Scrapped Princess.

Dustvin

The continent on which humanity is contained is called "Dustvin", from the old language word for "garbage can" ("dust bin"). The old language is shown to be English.

Rally Point/Proxy

Typically referred to in the series as an amorphous creature that is made by Peacemakers out of organic matter (typically humans). The creature can absorb other living beings and add to its structure. The heart of the Rally Point is a blue energy-like crystal that controls it. There is also discussion about how the Scrapped Princess can be used as a Rally Point to prevent the Peacemakers from taking over the minds of humans. This suggests that Rally Points are magic focal points that can be used for other purposes.

Combat Weapon

Combat weapons consist of two types. The older versions are the Dragoons. Their newer counterparts are the Valkyrie Type, also called the Peacemakers. However the Peacemakers were brainwashed by an alien species that attacked Earth, and now serve as the prison guards of the sealed world: Providence. They seek to eliminate Pacifica as she has the power to go against their wills and break the framework of the sealed world.

Race of Evil

The alien race who were humanity's enemy during the genesis war. Unwilling to cause the extinction of humanity, they instead contacted Celia Mauser and helped her to confine humanity to the sealed continent of Dust-Bin, which they regarded as a "wildlife preserve" for humanity, where humanity could survive without posing a future threat to their race.

See also
 List of Scrapped Princess episodes

References

External links
Cast listing at Seiyuu.info

Scrapped Princess